The 1891 North Carolina Tar Heels football team represented the University of North Carolina in the 1891 college football season.  They played two games with a final record of 0–2.  There had been no football team since 1889 prior to this season. The team captains for the 1891 season were Michael Hoke and George Graham. William P. Graves has been reported as this team's coach, but he was the coach in the spring of 1891 when UNC was scheduled to play, but did not. UNC was leading in its contest with Wake Forest but forfeited before the game was over.

Schedule

References

North Carolina
North Carolina Tar Heels football seasons
College football winless seasons
North Carolina Tar Heels football